The Echo Post Office, at 3455 S. Echo Rd. in Echo, Utah was listed on the National Register of Historic Places in 2003.

It is a small post office building, built perhaps in 1928 or perhaps as early as 1900.

References

Post office buildings in Utah
National Register of Historic Places in Summit County, Utah
Victorian architecture in Utah
Government buildings completed in 1928